The Leonard Reid House is a historic home in Sarasota, Florida, United States. It was originally located at 1435 7th Street. On October 29, 2002, it was added to the U.S. National Register of Historic Places.

The frame vernacular residence was built in 1926 on Coconut Avenue in Sarasota's Overtown neighborhood. Reid and his family were prominent members of Sarasota's African American community. It was moved to 2529 N. Orange Avenue on May 20, 2022 where it will be the home for the Sarasota African American Cultural Coalition.

See also
Newtown (Sarasota, Florida)

References

External links
 Sarasota County listings at National Register of Historic Places
 Pure & Total Fitness Center in the Leonard Reid House

Houses on the National Register of Historic Places in Sarasota County, Florida
Houses in Sarasota, Florida
Houses completed in 1926
Vernacular architecture in Florida
1926 establishments in Florida